The Transport and Communication functional constituency was in the elections for the Legislative Council of Hong Kong first created in 1995 as one of the nine new functional constituencies under the electoral reform carried out by the then Governor Chris Patten, in which the electorate consisted of total 109,716 eligible voters worked related to the transport and communication industry.

The constituency was abolished with the colonial Legislative Council dissolved after the transfer of the sovereignty in 1997.

A similar Transport functional constituency was created for the 1998 election by the HKSAR government with a much narrow electorate base in which 178 electors are only limited to transportation associations.

Councillors represented

Election results

References

Constituencies of Hong Kong
Constituencies of Hong Kong Legislative Council
1995 establishments in Hong Kong
Constituencies established in 1995
1997 disestablishments in Hong Kong
Constituencies disestablished in 1997
Transport in Hong Kong